Malappuram District Sports Complex is a sports complex owned by Malappuram District Sports Council, which is located between Payyanad,Manjeri and Malappuram, Kerala, India.  The Malappuram District Sports Complex Stadium hosted 2013–14 Indian Federation Cup.

References

Sports venues in Kerala
Buildings and structures in Malappuram district
Year of establishment missing